Kevin McMahon (born 1982 in Rosscarbery, County Cork) is an Irish sportsperson.  He plays Gaelic football with his local club Carbery Rangers and was a member of the Cork senior inter-county team from 2004 until 2008.

References

1982 births
Living people
Carbery Rangers Gaelic footballers
Cork inter-county Gaelic footballers
People from Rosscarbery